Tetro Creek is a stream in the U.S. state of South Dakota.

Tetro Creek has the name of a local family.

See also
List of rivers of South Dakota

References

Rivers of Lawrence County, South Dakota
Rivers of South Dakota